Angus Claude Macdonell (June 23, 1861 – April 18, 1924) was a Canadian lawyer and politician.

Born in Toronto, Canada West, Macdonell received a Bachelor of Civil Law degree in 1886 from Trinity College, Toronto and a D.C.L. degree in 1902. He was called to the Bar of Ontario in 1886. He was elected to the House of Commons of Canada for Toronto South in the 1904 federal election. A Conservative, he was re-elected in 1908 and 1911. He was summoned to the Senate of Canada representing the senatorial division of Toronto South, Ontario in 1917 on the advice of Robert Borden. He served until 1921.

External links
 

1861 births
1924 deaths
Canadian senators from Ontario
Conservative Party of Canada (1867–1942) MPs
Conservative Party of Canada (1867–1942) senators
Members of the House of Commons of Canada from Ontario
Lawyers in Ontario
Trinity College (Canada) alumni
University of Toronto alumni